Aloinopsis setifera is a species of succulent plant, native to Southern Africa.

References
 The Plant List

setifera